The Humboldt was a wooden steamer built in Eureka, CA in 1896. She sailed on the Alaska route for many years, and operated between San Francisco and Los Angeles between 1919 and 1932, when she was withdrawn from service. She was purchased  by the White Flyer Line in 1919, and by the Los Angeles San Francisco Navigation Company in 1927.

References

External links
 Photo of Steamer Humboldt departing for Nome with passengers, June 2, 1901
 Description of wooden steamer Humboldt, Tacoma Public Library, Ships and Shipping Database

1896 ships
History of Humboldt County, California
Passenger ships of the United States
Ships built in Eureka, California
Steamboats of Alaska
Steamships of the United States